Basilodon is an extinct genus of dicynodont therapsid. The type species, Basilodon woodwardi was originally named in 1921 as Dicynodon woodwardi. Fossils have been found in the Cistecephalus Assemblage Zone and Dicynodon Assemblage Zone of the Balfour Formation of the Beaufort Group in South Africa.

References

Dicynodonts
Lopingian synapsids of Africa
Permian South Africa
Fossils of South Africa
Beaufort Group
Fossil taxa described in 2011
Anomodont genera